Koli-ye Sofla or Kali-ye Sofla may refer to:
 Koli-ye Sofla, Ardabil
 Kali-ye Sofla, East Azerbaijan